The Fontana Modern Masters was a series of pocket guides on writers, philosophers, and other thinkers and theorists who shaped the intellectual landscape of the twentieth century. The first five titles were published on 12 January 1970 by Fontana Books, the paperback imprint of William Collins & Co, and the series editor was Frank Kermode, who was Professor of Modern English Literature at University College London. The books were very popular with students, who "bought them by the handful", according to Kermode, and they were instantly recognisable by their eye-catching covers, which featured brightly coloured abstract art and sans-serif typography.

Art as book covers 

The Fontana Modern Masters occupy a unique place in publishing history – not for their contents but their covers, which draw on the following developments in twentieth-century art and literature:

 Twentieth-century geometric abstraction, colour-field painting and hard-edge painting.
 Op Art, and in particular the work of Victor Vasarely.
 The English beatnik Brion Gysin's cut-up technique as popularized by William Burroughs.

The cover concept was the brainchild of Fontana's art director John Constable, who had been experimenting with a cover treatment based on cut-ups of The Mud Bath, a key work of British geometric abstraction by the painter David Bomberg. However, a visit to the Grabowski Gallery in London introduced Constable to the work of Oliver Bevan, a graduate of the Royal College of Art in 1964, whose optical and geometric paintings were influenced by Vasarely's Op Art. On seeing Bevan's work, Constable commissioned him to create the covers for the first ten Fontana Modern Masters, which Bevan painted as rectilinear arrangements of tesselating blocks. Each cover was thus a piece of abstract art, but as an incentive for readers to buy all ten books the covers could be arranged to create a larger, composite artwork. The "set of ten" books appeared in 1970–71 but overran when Joyce was published with the same cover as Guevara:

 Camus by Conor Cruise O'Brien, 1970
 Chomsky by John Lyons, 1970
 Fanon by David Caute, 1970
 Guevara by Andrew Sinclair, 1970
 Lévi-Strauss by Edmund Leach, 1970
 Lukács by George Lichtheim, 1970
 Marcuse by Alasdair MacIntyre, 1970
 McLuhan by Jonathan Miller, 1971
 Orwell by Raymond Williams, 1971
 Wittgenstein by David Pears, 1971
 Joyce by John Gross, 1971

A second "set of ten" featuring a new Bevan cut-up was published in 1971–73 but the inclusion of Joyce in the first "set of ten" left this second set one book short:
 Freud by Richard Wollheim, 1971
 Reich by Charles Rycroft, 1971
 Yeats by Denis Donoghue, 1971
 Gandhi by George Woodcock, 1972
 Lenin by Robert Conquest, 1972
 Mailer by Richard Poirier, 1972
 Russell by A J Ayer, 1972
 Jung by Anthony Storr, 1973
 Lawrence by Frank Kermode, 1973

A third "set of ten" featuring Bevan's kinetic Pyramid painting began to appear in 1973–74 but Constable left before the set was complete and his replacement, Mike Dempsey, scrapped the set-of-ten incentive after eight books:
 Beckett by A Alvarez, 1973
 Einstein by Jeremy Bernstein, 1973
 Laing by Edgar Z. Friedenberg, 1973
 Popper by Bryan Magee, 1973
 Kafka by Erich Heller, 1974
 Le Corbusier by Stephen Gardiner, 1974
 Proust by Roger Shattuck, 1974
 Weber by Donald G MacRae, 1974

Dempsey switched the covers to a white background and commissioned a new artist James Lowe, whose cover art for the next eight books in 1975-76 was based on triangles: 
 Eliot by Stephen Spender, 1975
 Marx by David McLellan, 1975
 Pound by Donald Davie, 1975
 Sartre by Arthur C Danto, 1975
 Artaud by Martin Esslin, 1976
 Keynes by D. E. Moggridge, 1976
 Saussure by Jonathan Culler, 1976
 Schoenberg by Charles Rosen, 1976

Nine more books appeared in 1977–79 with cover art by James Lowe based on squares:
 Engels by David McLellan, 1977
 Gramsci by James Joll, 1977
 Durkheim by Anthony Giddens, 1978
 Heidegger by George Steiner, 1978
 Nietzsche by J P Stern, 1978
 Trotsky by Irving Howe, 1978
 Klein by Hanna Segal, 1979
 Pavlov by Jeffrey A Gray, 1979
 Piaget by Margaret A Boden, 1979

Dempsey left Fontana Books in 1979 but continued to oversee the Modern Masters series until a new art director, Patrick Mortimer, was appointed in 1980. Four more books followed under Mortimer with cover art by James Lowe based on circles:
 Evans-Pritchard by Mary Douglas, 1980
 Darwin by Wilma George, 1982
 Barthes by Jonathan Culler, 1983
 Adorno by Martin Jay, 1984

The cover concept was dropped after this and a new design was used that featured a portrait of the Modern Master as a line drawing or later a tinted photograph, and mixed serif and sans-serif typefaces, upright and italic fonts, block capitals, lowercase letters and faux handwriting. The design was used for reprints and six new titles: 
 Foucault by J. G. Merquior, 1985
 Derrida by Christopher Norris, 1987
 Winnicott by Adam Phillips, 1988
 Lacan by Malcolm Bowie, 1991
 Arendt by David Watson, 1992
 Berlin by John Gray, 1995

Book covers as art 
Fontana's use of art as book covers went full circle in 2003-05 when the British conceptual artist Jamie Shovlin "reproduced" the covers of the forty-eight Fontana Modern Masters from Camus to Barthes as a series of flawed paintings (the titles are missing and the colours have run) in watercolour and ink on paper, each measuring 28 x 19 cm. However, Shovlin also noticed ten forthcoming titles listed on the books' front endpapers which, for reasons unknown, had not been published:

 Dostoyevsky by Harold Rosenberg
 Fuller by Allan Temko
 Jakobson by Thomas A Sebeok
 Kipling by Lionel Trilling
 Mann by Lionel Trilling
 Merleau-Ponty by H. P. Dreyfus
 Needham by George Steiner
 Sherrington by Jonathan Miller
 Steinberg by John Hollander
 Winnicott by Masud Khan (this was published with a different author, as listed in the previous section)

Shovlin then set out to paint these "lost" titles and thus "complete" the series. To do this he devised a "Fontana Colour Chart" based on the covers of the published books, and a scoring system that – like his paintings – was deliberately flawed. Given these flaws, and those in Fontana's original series, the absence of any modern masters from the visual arts is notable, since Matisse was one of four "forthcoming titles" that Shovlin had apparently overlooked:

 Benjamin by Samuel Weber
 Erikson by Robert Lifton
 Ho by David Halberstam
 Matisse by David Sylvester

Benjamin and Matisse have since been included in a new series of seventeen large Fontana Modern Masters that Shovlin painted in 2011-12. These use a similar scoring system to his watercolours of 2003–05 and a new "Acrylic Variations Colour Wheel". The paintings are acrylic on canvas and each measures 210 x 130 cm:

 Arendt by David Watson (Variation 1)
 Benjamin by Samuel Weber (Variation 3)
 Berlin by John Gray (Variation 1)
 Derrida by Christopher Norris (Variation 3)
 Dostoyevsky by Harold Rosenberg (Variation 1)
 Foucault by J. G. Merquior (Variation 1B)
 Fuller by Allan Temko (Variation 3)
 Jakobson by Krystyna Pomorska (Variation 2)
 Kipling by Lionel Trilling (Variation 2)
 Lacan by Malcolm Bowie (Variation 1)
 Mann by Lionel Trilling (Variation 1A)
 Matisse by David Sylvester (Variation 1A)
 Merleau-Ponty by H. P. Dreyfus (Variation 1)
 Needham by George Steiner (Variation 3A)
 Sherrington by Jonathan Miller (Variation 3)
 Steinberg by John Hollander (Variation 3B)
 Winnicott by Adam Phillips (Variation 3)

See also 
 Foucault - one of the books in the series

References

External links 
 Fontana Modern Masters or books, art, and books as art: a cover story

Series of books
Book arts
Book design
Typography
British non-fiction books
Book publishing companies of the United Kingdom